Alan Richard Michaels (born November 12, 1944) is an American television sportscaster currently working as the play-by-play announcer for Thursday Night Football on Prime Video and in an emeritus role for NBC Sports. He has worked on network sports television since 1971, with his most recent work being with NBC Sports after nearly three decades (1976–2006) with ABC Sports. Michaels is known for his many years calling play-by-play of National Football League games, including ABC Monday Night Football from 1986 to 2005 and NBC Sunday Night Football from 2006 to 2021. He is also known for famous calls in other sports, including the Miracle on Ice at the 1980 Winter Olympics and the earthquake-interrupted Game 3 of the 1989 World Series.

Early life and education
Michaels was born to a Jewish family in Brooklyn, New York, to Jay Leonard Michaels and Lila Roginsky/Ross. He grew up as a Brooklyn Dodgers fan. In 1958, Michaels' family moved to Los Angeles, the same year the Dodgers left Brooklyn. He graduated from Alexander Hamilton High School in 1962. Michaels attended  Arizona State University, where he majored in radio and television and minored in journalism. He worked as a sports writer for ASU's independent student newspaper, The State Press, and called Sun Devils football, basketball, and baseball games for the campus radio station. He also is a member of Sigma Nu fraternity.

Early career
Michaels's first job in television was with Chuck Barris Productions, choosing women to appear on The Dating Game. His first sportscasting job came in 1967, when he was hired to do public relations for the Los Angeles Lakers and serve as a color commentator on the team's radio broadcasts alongside veteran play-by-play announcer Chick Hearn. However, he was terminated after appearing on just four games due to Chick Hearn’s displeasure on working with someone so young.

He resumed his broadcasting career in 1968 after moving to Honolulu, where he worked as a sports anchor for KHVH-TV (now KITV) and called play-by-play for the Hawaii Islanders baseball team in the Pacific Coast League as well as the University of Hawaii's football and basketball teams and local high school football games. He was named Hawaii's ‘Sportscaster of the Year’ in 1969. In 1970, Michaels appeared as attorney Dave Bronstein in an episode of Hawaii Five-O called "Run, Johnny, Run" (Air date: January 14, 1970); the episode also featured a young Christopher Walken.

In 1971, Michaels moved to Cincinnati, where he became the radio play-by-play announcer for the Cincinnati Reds of Major League Baseball. In 1972, after the Reds won the National League Championship Series and advanced to the World Series, he helped to cover the Fall Classic for NBC Sports. He also was the network's play-by-play man for the hockey coverage at the 1972 Winter Olympics in Sapporo, Japan.

In 1973, after NBC announcer Bill Enis died from a heart attack at the age of 39 two days before he was to call the regular-season NFL finale between the Houston Oilers and Cincinnati Bengals, Michaels was brought in to replace Enis in the booth with Dave Kocourek.

In 1974, he left the Reds for a similar position with the San Francisco Giants and also covered basketball for UCLA, replacing Dick Enberg on the Bruins' tape delayed telecasts of their home games, during a period when UCLA was in the midst of an 88-game winning streak. He left NBC that year and announced regional NFL games for CBS Sports in 1975. In 1976 he joined ABC Sports part-time to call the network's backup Monday Night Baseball games. That year, he called two no-hitters: by the Pirates' John Candelaria vs. Los Angeles on August 9 (for ABC) and the Giants' John Montefusco at Atlanta on September 29, 1976 (for Giants radio).

ABC Sports (1977–2006)
In January 1977, Michaels signed with ABC Sports on a full-time basis. In 1983, he became the network's lead baseball announcer, replacing Keith Jackson. Up until that point, Michaels and Jackson would split play–by–play duties for ABC's coverage of the World Series beginning in 1979, with Michaels assigned to call the games from the National League park and Jackson calling games from the American League park.

Over the next three decades, Michaels covered a wide variety of sports for ABC, including Major League Baseball, college football (working alongside the likes of Frank Broyles, Lee Grosscup, and Ara Parseghian from 1977–1985 and later, his Monday Night Football colleagues Frank Gifford and Dan Dierdorf for the Sugar Bowl from 1989–1992), college basketball (normally teaming with Joe B. Hall from 1987–1989), the Indianapolis 500, ice hockey, track and field events, horse racing (including the Kentucky Derby, Preakness Stakes, and Belmont Stakes from 1986 to 2000), golf, boxing (such as the 1985 Marvin Hagler/Thomas Hearns fight), figure skating (working alongside Dick Button and Peggy Fleming), road cycling (Michaels in particular, provided commentary for those events at the 1984 Summer Olympics with Greg LeMond and Eric Heiden), and many events of the Olympic Games as well as the Olympic trials.

Other prominent events that Michaels covered for ABC included serving as the studio host for the Stanley Cup Finals from –. Also, he served as host for the yearly Tiger Woods Monday night specials that aired in July or August.

Episodes of Wide World of Sports featuring Michaels early in his ABC career have been featured at least two occasions on the ESPN Classic comedy series Cheap Seats.

The Miracle on Ice

Two of Michaels's more famous broadcasts were of the 1980 Winter Olympics ice hockey medal round match between the United States and the Soviet Union, and the attempted third game of the 1989 World Series.

In 1980, an unheralded group of college ice hockey players from the United States won the gold medal at the Olympic Winter Games. The medal round match on February 22—which, contrary to popular belief, did not yet assure the team of the gold medal—was of particular interest, as it was played against a heavily favored professional squad from the Soviet Union, and was in front of an incredibly excited pro-American crowd in Lake Placid, New York. Michaels's memorable broadcast of this game, including his interjection—"Do you believe in miracles? YES!"—as time expired on the 4–3 U.S. victory, earned the game the media nickname of The Miracle on Ice.

Most assume that the game was broadcast live (indeed, CTV, which held Canadian rights to the game, aired it live); but in reality, the game started at 5:05 pm Eastern Standard Time and ABC decided against pre-empting local and network news (on the East Coast) to carry the game live. Instead, most of it—including the entire third period—was broadcast within the regularly scheduled, prime-time telecast from 8:30 to 11 pm Eastern time (and on a six-and-a-half-hour delay on the West Coast from 8:30 to 11 pm Pacific Standard Time). Despite being on tape, the game was one of the highest-rated programs of the 1979–80 television season and remains the most-watched ice hockey game in the history of American television.

Michaels, along with broadcasting partner Ken Dryden, recreated their Olympic commentary in the 2004 movie Miracle. Although Michaels and Dryden recreated the bulk of their commentary for the film, the closing seconds of the game against the Soviet Union used the original ABC Sports commentary from 1980. Gavin O'Connor, the director of Miracle, decided to use the last 10 seconds of Michaels's original "Do you believe in miracles? YES!" call in the film because he felt he couldn't ask him to recreate the emotion he experienced at that moment. Thus they cleaned up the recording to make the transition to the authentic call as seamless as possible.

Michaels later recalled, "When I look back, obviously Lake Placid would be the highlight of my career. I can't think of anything that would ever top it. I can't dream up a scenario."

Michaels was only on this particular assignment because he had done one hockey game, eight years prior. The game in question was the gold medal game (the Soviet Union vs. Czechoslovakia) of the 1972 Winter Olympics (on NBC) in Sapporo, Japan. Other announcers on the ABC Sports roster such as Keith Jackson, Frank Gifford, and Howard Cosell had never done a hockey game before. Michaels recalled this during a Real Sports interview in January 2009. Michaels also apparently beat out WABC-AM and New York Islanders commentator George Michael for the assignment.

Two days later, Michaels would broadcast the gold medal game, in which the U.S. defeated Finland, closing the game out by declaring "This impossible dream comes true!"

Al Michaels continued serving as ABC's lead play-by-play announcer for their ice hockey coverage for their next two Winter Olympics, both with Dryden, the lead color commentator. In 1984 from Sarajevo, Mike Eruzione, who was the captain of the gold medal-winning United States ice hockey team from 1980, primarily worked with Don Chevrier. For ABC's final Winter Olympics four years later, Eruzione was this time, paired with Jiggs McDonald.

Michaels along with John Davidson would later call Games 1 and 4 of the Calgary–Los Angeles Stanley Cup playoff series in 1993 for ABC.

Memorable baseball moments

1972 National League Championship Series

Even though the events of October 17, 1989, in San Francisco are widely considered to be the most dramatic baseball-related moment of Michaels's career, he had several others that were memorable.

In the 1972 National League Championship Series, the defending World Series Champion Pittsburgh Pirates faced the Cincinnati Reds. In Game 5, with both teams tied at two games apiece, the Pirates led 3–2 in the bottom of the ninth inning and were three outs away from advancing to the World Series. But Pirates closer Dave Giusti unraveled. He surrendered a game-tying home run to Johnny Bench before allowing back-to-back singles to Tony Pérez and Denis Menke before being relieved by Bob Moose, who almost worked out of the jam by recording two outs. But with pinch-hitter Hal McRae at the plate, Moose lost his footing and uncorked a wild pitch sending George Foster, who was pinch running for Pérez, home with the pennant-clinching run and setting off a massive celebration at Riverfront Stadium.

As previously mentioned, later that October, Michaels participated in his first ever World Series as a broadcaster, where he assisted NBC's Curt Gowdy for Games 1–2, 6, and 7 in Cincinnati. Michaels was a product of the then broadcasting policy of announcers who represented the participating teams (a process that ended following the 1976 World Series) being invited to do televised network play–by–play for the World Series. As such, Games 3–5 of the 1972 World Series instead, featured Oakland Athletics broadcaster Monte Moore working for NBC alongside Curt Gowdy.

1983 World Series

On June 6, 1983, Michaels officially succeeded Keith Jackson as the lead play-by-play announcer for Monday Night Baseball. Michaels, who spent seven seasons working backup games (initially teaming with Bob Gibson and Norm Cash), was apparently very miffed over ABC Sports' delay in announcing him as their top baseball announcer. Unlike Jackson, whose forte was college football, Michaels as previously mentioned, had gigs with the Cincinnati Reds and San Francisco Giants before joining ABC in 1976. TV Guide huffed about Jackson by saying "A football guy, on baseball!" Thus, Michaels did play-by-play for games on weekends.

1985 World Series

Perhaps Michaels's first historic call with ABC Sports while covering Major League Baseball occurred in what is now known by many as the Don Denkinger game. The Kansas City Royals trailed the St. Louis Cardinals 3–1 in a series that was panned for being low-scoring and dull. After a Royals win in St. Louis forced the action back to Kansas City, the sixth game was also low scoring. However, this contest grew into a tense pitcher's duel.

In the bottom of the 9th, pinch-hitter Jorge Orta led off for the Royals against Cardinals pitcher Todd Worrell with Kansas City trailing 1–0 and hit a ground ball to first baseman Jack Clark. Clark threw over to pitcher Worrell, who was running over to cover first base in time to beat the speedy Orta and did. Yet first base umpire Don Denkinger still called Orta safe at first. Steve Balboni then hit a pop-up to first which Jack Clark missed for an error, keeping Balboni's at-bat alive, and he promptly singled to put men on first and second.

The infamous and controversial leadoff single by Orta and the Jack Clark error eventually led to the Royals loading the bases and putting the tying run on third base and the winning run on second with one out for Dane Iorg. Iorg hit a 2-run single and the Royals came back to win 2–1. The Royals went on to win Game 7 11–0 and complete the comeback after being down 3 games to 1. However, it was Denkinger's dubious 'safe' call, and not Iorg's hit, Clark's error, Jim Sundberg's heroics (for his difficult slide past catcher Darrell Porter for the winning run) or the Game 7 blowout that were most remembered in years to come.

Just prior to the start of the 1985 World Series, ABC removed Howard Cosell from scheduled announcing duties as punishment for his controversial book I Never Played the Game. In Cosell's place came Tim McCarver (joining play-by-play man Michaels and fellow color commentator Jim Palmer), who was beginning his trek of being a part of numerous World Series telecasts. Reportedly, by 1985, Cosell was considered to be difficult to work with on baseball telecasts. Apparently, Cosell and Michaels got into a fairly heated argument following the conclusion of their coverage of the 1984 American League Championship Series due to Cosell's supposed drunkenness among other problems. Rumor has it that Michaels went as far as to urge ABC executives to remove Cosell from the booth. Ultimately, Michaels went public with his problems with Cosell. Michaels claimed that "Howard had become a cruel, evil, vicious person."

1986 American League Championship Series
In 1986, Michaels was also on hand for what he says was "the greatest of all the thousands of games I've done." On October 12 at Anaheim Stadium, Michaels along with Jim Palmer called Game 5 of the American League Championship Series. The California Angels held a 3 games to 1 lead of a best-of-seven against the Boston Red Sox. In the game, the Angels held a 5–2 lead going into the ninth inning. Boston scored two runs on a home run by Don Baylor, closing the gap to 5–4.

When Donnie Moore came in to shut down the rally, there were two outs, and a runner on first base, Rich Gedman, who had been hit by a pitch. The Angels were one out from their first-ever trip to the World Series. But Dave Henderson hit a 2–2 pitch off Moore for a home run, giving the Red Sox a 6–5 lead. The Angels were able to score a run in the bottom of the ninth, pushing the game into extra innings. Moore continued to pitch for the Angels. He was able to stifle a 10th inning Red Sox rally by getting Jim Rice to ground into a double play. Nevertheless, the Red Sox were able to score off Moore in the 11th-inning via a sacrifice fly by Henderson. The Angels could not score in the bottom of the 11th and lost the game 7–6.

The defeat still left the Angels in a 3 games to 2 advantage, with two more games to play at Fenway Park. The Angels were not able to recover, losing both games by wide margins, 10–4 and 8–1. Game 7 of the 1986 ALCS ended with Calvin Schiraldi striking out Jerry Narron.

Despite the fact that ABC Sports and ESPN had been under the same corporate umbrella (the Walt Disney Company) since 1996, Michaels never served as a regular commentator for ESPN Major League Baseball. The only time that Michaels appeared in an ESPN booth of any kind was as a guest commentator on Wednesday Night Baseball in 2003 as part of ESPN's Living Legends Series. Michaels joined Gary Thorne and Joe Morgan, whom he worked with on ABC's 1989 World Series coverage and served as ABC's #2 baseball team behind Michaels, Jim Palmer and Tim McCarver in 1989, for a game at Dodger Stadium between the Los Angeles Dodgers and Cincinnati Reds.

1987 World Series
In a February 2015 interview, Michaels alleged that the Minnesota Twins pumped artificial crowd noise into the Metrodome during the 1987 World Series against the St. Louis Cardinals. Responding to Michaels' theory, Twins President Dave St. Peter said that he did not think the Twins needed "conspiracy theories" in order to win the World Series. Instead, he argued that "appreciation and respect" should be paid to players like Frank Viola, Gary Gaetti, Kent Hrbek, and Kirby Puckett, who, he said, "came out of nowhere to win a championship."

1989 World Series

On October 17, 1989, Michaels was in San Francisco, preparing to cover the third game of the 1989 World Series between the home team, the San Francisco Giants, and the visiting Oakland Athletics. ABC's network telecast began with a recap of the first two games (to the soundtrack of James Taylor's "Hello Old Friend"), both won by Oakland. Soon after Michaels handed off to his broadcast partner, Tim McCarver, who started assessing the Giants' chances for victory in the game, the Loma Prieta earthquake struck (at approximately 5:04 p.m. local time). While the network feed was breaking up due to the shaking, Michaels exclaimed "I'll tell you what, we're having an earth —", and at that moment, the feed completely  broke up before he could finish his sentence. ABC then put up a green "World Series" telop graphic card on the screen for technical difficulties and restored audio via a telephone link 15 seconds later.  Michaels quipped, "Well folks, that's the greatest open in the history of television, bar none!" Michaels then reported from the ABC Sports production truck outside Candlestick Park on the earthquake, for which he later was nominated for an Emmy Award for news broadcasting. Michaels relayed his reports to Ted Koppel, who was stationed at the ABC News bureau in Washington, D.C.

According to Tim McCarver, when the earthquake hit, he, Michaels and Jim Palmer immediately grabbed hold of what they perceived to be the armrests. In reality, the announcers were clutching on each other's thighs and they were each left with bruises the next day. Years later (on a 1999 SportsCenter retrospective about the 1989 World Series earthquake), Al Michaels would boldly admit his strong belief that had the earthquake lasted much longer than 15 seconds, he would have been killed. Michaels added that the only time that he really had been scared during the earthquake was when he moved in a position which he perceived to be backward. The three announcers were sitting on a ledge with their backs turned and no bracing behind them.

There was later speculation that if Michaels won an arbitration case involving ABC, he would join CBS as its lead baseball announcer. ABC following the 1989 World Series, had lost its baseball package to CBS for the next four years. Michaels had been feuding with the network over an alleged violation of company policy. Michaels' contract with ABC was originally set to expire in late 1992. Ultimately however, ABC announced a contract extension that sources said would keep Michaels at ABC through at least the end of 1995 and would pay him at least $2.2 million annually with the potential to earn more. That would make Michaels the highest-paid sports announcer in television.

The Baseball Network (1994–1995)

In 1994, ABC resumed their relationship with Major League Baseball for the first time since 1989 with a broadcasting joint-venture with NBC dubbed The Baseball Network. Michaels was once again paired with Jim Palmer and Tim McCarver, for whom he had broadcast three World Series (1985, 1987, and 1989), two All-Star Games (1986 and 1988), and the 1988 National League Championship Series with. On the subject of Michaels returning to baseball for the first time since the Loma Prieta earthquake interrupted the World Series, Jim Palmer said, "Here Al is, having done five games since 1989, and steps right in. It's hard to comprehend how one guy could so amaze."

A player's strike in August 1994 would however, force the cancellation of that season's postseason, including the World Series. Then in June 1995, both ABC and NBC announced that they would be dissolving The Baseball Network at the end of the 1995 season. The following month, Michaels along with Jim Palmer and Tim McCarver, called the All-Star Game from Arlington, Texas. Come that October, Michaels, Palmer, and McCarver could call Games 1–2 of the National League Division Series between the Cincinnati Reds and Los Angeles Dodgers, Game 4 of the NLDS between the Atlanta Braves and Colorado Rockies, Games 1–2 of the National League Championship Series between Atlanta and Cincinnati, and Games 1, 4–5 of the World Series between Atlanta and the Cleveland Indians.

In what would be the final out that he would call for a baseball broadcast on ABC, Michaels yelled "Back to Georgia!" following Cleveland closer José Mesa's strikeout of Atlanta second baseman Mark Lemke. ABC was in-line to televise a possible seventh game (since NBC was already scheduled to broadcast Game 6), but the Braves wound up clinching the world title two nights later. Game 5 of the 1995 World Series would not only prove to be the final Major League Baseball game that Michaels would call (not counting a one shot appearance on MLB Network for a game between the San Francisco Giants and New York Mets on July 8, 2011), but it would also prove to be the last time that a Major League Baseball game would be broadcast on ABC until the 2020 Wild Card series.

Michaels would later write in his 2014 autobiography You Can't Make This Up: Miracles, Memories, and the Perfect Marriage of Sports and Television that the competition between the two networks could be so juvenile that neither ABC nor NBC wanted to promote each other's telecasts during the 1995 World Series. To give you a better idea, in the middle of Game 1, Michaels was handed a promo that read "Join us here on ABC for Game 4 in Cleveland on Wednesday night and for Game 5 if necessary, Thursday." Michaels however, would soon follow this up by saying "By the way, if you're wondering about Games 2 and 3, I can't tell you exactly where you can see them, but here's a hint: Last night, Bob Costas, Bob Uecker, and Joe Morgan [NBC's broadcast crew] were spotted in Underground Atlanta."

Monday Night Football

Michaels's longest-running assignment was that of the lead play-by-play announcer on ABC's Monday Night Football telecasts, a position he held for 20 seasons beginning in 1986. Before that, his most notable NFL assignment for ABC was hosting (along with Jim Lampley) the pre-game coverage of Super Bowl XIX at the end of the 1984 season. In 1988, he called his first Super Bowl. Three years later, he was on hand to call the thrilling Super Bowl between the New York Giants and Buffalo Bills. Bills kicker Scott Norwood missed a potentially game-winning field goal, and thus, ensured the Giants victory.

The trio of Michaels, Dan Dierdorf (who joined MNF the year after Michaels's first), and Frank Gifford lasted until the 1997 season when Gifford was replaced following disclosure of an extramarital affair. During the 1980s, Gifford would fill-in for Michaels on play-by-play whenever he went on baseball assignments for the League Championship Series (1986 and 1988) or World Series (1987 and 1989).

Former Cincinnati Bengals quarterback Boomer Esiason (who left after the 1999 season) replaced Gifford in 1998, and Dierdorf was dropped after that season. Unexpectedly, comedian Dennis Miller joined the cast in 2000 along with Dan Fouts. In 2002, following Miller and Fouts' departure, John Madden joined Michaels in a well-received pairing.

NBA on ABC

After disastrous ratings in the 2003 NBA Finals, ABC decided to revamp their lead NBA broadcast team. Brad Nessler was reassigned to the second broadcast team, where he was joined by Sean Elliott and Dan Majerle. Michaels was hired to replace Nessler as lead broadcaster of the NBA.

For the first several weeks of the 2003–2004 season, he had no partner. However, Doc Rivers, a critically acclaimed analyst when he worked with Turner Sports, became available after a 1–19 start by his Orlando Magic. Rivers was hired weeks before ABC's Christmas Day season opener. He and Michaels worked that game together, one of only six they did together during the regular season (all other games Rivers worked were with Brad Nessler). During the playoffs, the team worked every single telecast, including the 2004 NBA Finals, which saw great improvement in television ratings. During the 2004 NBA Playoffs, Doc Rivers was hired by the Boston Celtics. Though Rivers continued to work games with him throughout the rest of the playoffs, ABC would have to find a new lead color commentator for the 2004–2005 season.

Early in the 2004–2005 season, ABC found a new partner for Al Michaels. Memphis Grizzlies coach Hubie Brown, a broadcasting legend with CBS, TBS, and TNT, was forced into retirement due to health reasons and was soon after hired to replace Doc Rivers. He and Brown began their partnership on Christmas Day 2004, working the highly anticipated Shaquille O'Neal-Kobe Bryant game. After that game, the two did not do a game together again until March 2005. He became sporadic in NBA coverage, doing two games in early March, and then three more games in April. Brown worked every week of ABC's coverage, broadcasting some games with veteran broadcaster Mike Breen. For the 2005–2006 season, the pair were slated to remain as ABC's lead broadcast team. The duo worked that year's Christmas Day game between the Los Angeles Lakers and Miami Heat and was expected to work the NBA Finals together as well. However, due to his impending departure to NBC, that plan did not come to fruition.

Replacing him on The NBA on ABC was Mike Breen, who became the lead broadcaster for an over-the-air NBA package for the first time in his career. Breen worked the 2006 NBA Finals with Hubie Brown, as well as all the main games ABC broadcast that year. This gave ABC its first consistent lead broadcaster since Brad Nessler, as Breen (unlike Michaels) did games every week. To put things into proper perspective, during his two-season tenure as ABC's lead NBA broadcaster, he called just 13 of a possible 26 regular season games, with all but two games taking place from either Los Angeles (where he resides) or Sacramento.

Besides his inconsistent work, Michaels (despite being initially seen as adding credibility to ABC's NBA broadcasts in contrast to his predecessor, Brad Nessler) was criticized for apparently lacking the kind of enthusiasm and confidence (for instance, Michaels initially reacted to Amar'e Stoudemire's block of Tim Duncan's shot during the 2005 playoffs by calling it a "great, great contested shot") expected of a No. 1 play-by-play voice. Barry Horn of the Dallas Morning News said that Michaels was simply "not a basketball guy". Meanwhile, Bill Simmons said during the 2005 Finals that Michaels "shows up for these games, does his job, then drives home thinking, 'Only five weeks to the [NFL] Hall of Fame Game, I'm almost there!'"

Another criticism that he received was that he too often found himself making tediously long-winded explanations. In return, he would tend to talk over two or three possessions in a row (which Michaels seemed to be better suited for football and baseball broadcasts, for which he's better known). The result was that he would hardly have time to comment on the action viewers were seeing because he was so hung up on a prior subplot or storyline that he felt the audience just had to know about.

Move from ABC for NBC

ABC loses NFL rights
In 2003, Michaels was quoted as saying, "ABC Sports has been my professional home for the last 26 years, and I am delighted that will continue to be for several more..." after signing a long-term contract extension.

In 2005, it was announced that Monday Night Football would be moving from ABC to ESPN beginning with the 2006 season, and partner John Madden announced he would be joining NBC Sports, which had acquired the rights to Sunday Night Football games. Despite speculation that Michaels might be joining NBC as well, Michaels stated that he would continue as the MNF play-by-play announcer, stating, "I feel like I'm a creature of Monday night. I'm home and I'm staying home." Plans were for Michaels to be teamed with Joe Theismann (who would be coming over from Sunday Night Football) on the Monday night telecasts.

At the time, then-ABC Television President Alex Wallau said, "For 26 years Al has played a pivotal role here at ABC Sports, and for 17 of those years he's been the face and voice synonymous with television's most successful sports franchise, Monday Night Football... It's Al's outstanding play-by-play coverage, coupled with his breadth of knowledge, experience and enthusiasm, that keep MNF fans invigorated, excited and coming back for more." also, "Al Michaels has been invaluable to the Network and we are thrilled to have him remain in our family. [...] Al is the consummate professional and makes everyone around him better" said then-ABC Sports President Howard Katz; however, in the weeks leading up to Super Bowl XL, it was widely speculated that Michaels was attempting to get out of his contract with ESPN to join Madden at NBC. By this time, it was clear that NBC's Sunday Night Football would be the NFL's premier prime-time package, with ESPN's Monday Night Football relegated to secondary match-ups similar to that network's previous Sunday night telecasts. Michaels added fuel to the fire by refusing to state his future plans, and he couldn't "respond to rumors ... because that would become a distraction."

On February 8, 2006, ESPN announced that its Monday Night Football team would consist of Mike Tirico on play-by-play, with Theismann and Tony Kornheiser as analysts. ESPN explicitly stated that Michaels would not return to either Monday Night Football broadcasts or ABC's NBA broadcasts (on which Michaels had been lead NBA play-by-play man).

Oswald the Lucky Rabbit "trade"
On February 9, 2006, NBC confirmed that Michaels would be joining Madden at the network to broadcast football on Sunday nights, thus ending Michaels's 20-year run on Monday Night Football and almost 30 years of service with ABC. In exchange for letting Michaels out of his contract with ABC and ESPN, NBCUniversal sold ESPN cable rights to Friday coverage of the next four Ryder Cups, granted ESPN increased usage of Olympic highlights, and sold to parent company Disney the rights to Oswald the Lucky Rabbit, a cartoon character developed by Walt Disney himself (which he lost in 1928) but previously owned by Universal Pictures (now NBCUniversal). NBC Sports chairman Dick Ebersol explained, "We earn nothing from those rights; they've had no value in the United States."

Michaels had a bemused take on the "trade." After it was noted to Michaels that the Kansas City Chiefs gave the New York Jets a draft pick as compensation for releasing coach Herman Edwards from his contract, Michaels stated, "Oswald is definitely worth more than a fourth-round draft choice. I'm going to be a trivia answer someday." In an article with the magazine Game Informer, Warren Spector, a designer on the game Epic Mickey, stated that Disney CEO Bob Iger wanted Oswald to be in the game so badly, he made this trade to get the rights of the character back.

NBC Sports (2006-present)

Sunday Night Football

Michaels and Madden began their new NBC tenure on August 6, 2006, with the network's telecast of the preseason Pro Football Hall of Fame Game, with their regular-season debut on September 7. Michaels  called Sunday Night Football with John Madden from August 6, 2006 – April 15, 2009. On April 16, 2009, Cris Collinsworth made an agreement with NBC to join Michaels on replacing Madden for Sunday Night Football. On February 1, 2009, Michaels called Super Bowl XLIII, his first Super Bowl telecast for NBC and seventh overall as a play-by-play announcer. Michaels is the third man to ever do play-by-play for an NBC broadcast of a Super Bowl, following the footsteps of Curt Gowdy and Dick Enberg. Michaels also called Super Bowl XLVI on February 5, 2012, Super Bowl XLIX on February 1, 2015, Super Bowl LII on February 4, 2018, and Super Bowl LVI on February 13, 2022, and in doing so, he tied Pat Summerall for the most Super Bowls called by a play-by-play announcer, though Summerall still holds the record for the most Super Bowls announced at 16, having also worked Super Bowl I as a sideline reporter and Super Bowls II, IV, VI, and VIII as a color commentator.

Michaels usually ate his dinner while doing play-by-play commentary during a typical broadcast of Sunday Night Football. Michaels would have cookies and grapes during the first half and a light dinner during the second half, having his bites during commercial breaks.

On May 24, 2022, NBC announced that despite his official departure from Sunday Night Football following the 2021 season, Michaels would still call at least one NFL playoff game for NBC under an "emeritus" role.

NBC Olympic Daytime host
In March 2009, it was announced that Michaels would be serving as the daytime host for NBC's coverage of the 2010 Winter Olympics in Vancouver, British Columbia. It was Michaels's first involvement in an Olympic telecast since he called ice hockey at the 1988 Calgary Games for ABC, as well as his first non-NFL event for NBC. NBC Sports chairman Dick Ebersol said that Michaels had previously expressed an interest in contributing to the network's Olympics coverage. Michaels also co-hosted NBC's coverage of the Closing Ceremony (with Bob Costas). Michaels also served as daytime co-host (with Dan Patrick) for the 2012 Summer Olympics in London, and co-hosted the Closing Ceremony (with Costas and Ryan Seacrest). For the 2014 Winter Olympics in Sochi, Michaels served as weekday host on NBCSN and weekend daytime host on NBC. He returned to host daytime coverage for the 2016 Summer Olympics in Rio de Janeiro.

According to Michaels, ABC was in the running to purchase the broadcasting rights for the 1996 Summer Games from Atlanta. As a provision in his contract renewal with ABC back in 1992, in the event that ABC were to broadcast the Olympics again, Michaels would get to become the prime time anchor while Jim McKay would instead play an emeritus role. Ultimately though, NBC bought the rights to the Atlanta Games for $456 million, edging out ABC by $6 million.

Premier Boxing Champions

In January 2015, NBC announced that Michaels would be at ringside along with Marv Albert and Sugar Ray Leonard for the PBC on NBC Saturday night bouts. In partnership with Haymon Boxing, NBC would televise 20 PBC on NBC events, including five shown in prime time on Saturday nights.

MLB Network (2011)
On July 8, 2011, Michaels teamed up with Bob Costas (with the two announcers alternating between play-by-play and color commentary) to call a game between the New York Mets and San Francisco Giants on MLB Network. It was Michaels's first appearance on a baseball telecast since August 6, 2003 (when he served as a guest commentator on an ESPN game, as previously mentioned) and his first as a primary announcer since Game 5 of the 1995 World Series on ABC. (Michaels had called Games 1, 4 and 5 of that series with Jim Palmer and Tim McCarver, while Costas called Games 2, 3 and 6 with Joe Morgan and Bob Uecker for NBC.) Michaels and Costas also made appearances on SportsNet New York and Comcast SportsNet Bay Area during the game's middle innings, since the MLB Network broadcast was blacked out in the Mets' and Giants' respective home markets.

Thursday Night Football (2016, 2022–present) 
Michaels first called Thursday Night Football in 2016, as part of a deal which would see NBC produce several Thursday night games for broadcast on NFL Network with simulcasts on selected games on NBC. The following year, NBC confirmed that Mike Tirico would take over as the voice of NBC-produced Thursday night games.

On March 23, 2022, the NFL and Amazon announced that Michaels would become the full-time play-by-play announcer for Thursday Night Football, alongside Kirk Herbstreit, for the first year of the package airing exclusively on Amazon Prime Video and Twitch.

Awards and honors
Sportscasting
 Five-time Sports Emmy Award winner – Outstanding Sports Personality, Play-by-Play
 Three-time NSMA National Sportscaster of the Year
 Sportscaster of the Year – American Sportscasters Association (ASA)
 Sportscaster of the Year – Washington Journalism Review
 ASA Top 50 Sportscasters of All Time.
 Walter Cronkite Award for Excellence in Journalism (2002).
 Pacific Pioneer Broadcasters "Art Gilmore Career Achievement Award" June 16, 2017

Halls of Fame
 Star on the Hollywood Walk of Fame
 NSMA Hall of Fame inductee (class of 1998)
 Television Academy Hall of Fame inductee (class of 2013)
 2013 Pete Rozelle Radio & Television Award – Pro Football Hall of Fame
 2021 Ford C. Frick Award winner – Baseball Hall of Fame

State/local
 Football stadium at Alexander Hamilton High School in Los Angeles (Michaels's alma mater) named Al Michaels Field.

Personal life
Michaels is the eldest child of Jay and Lila Michaels. Michaels has a younger brother, David Michaels, and a younger sister, Susan.

Al Michaels currently resides in Los Angeles. He married his wife Linda on August 27, 1966. Al and Linda have two children together, Jennifer and Steven. Steven Michaels serves as president and CEO of independent film company Asylum Entertainment in Los Angeles. Michaels is also a Los Angeles Kings season ticket holder.

Al's younger brother David is a television producer. David Michaels has produced such programs as NBC's coverage of the Olympic Games, Triple Crown, and Fox Sports Net's Beyond the Glory series.

In March 2011, Michaels accompanied New England Patriots owner Robert Kraft and his wife, Myra, to Israel to visit Kraft Family Stadium in Jerusalem, an American football venue and home to three teams in the Israeli Football League, which is sponsored by the Kraft family. It was one of Myra Kraft's last trips before becoming sick with the cancer that would ultimately cause her death on July 20, 2011.

Michaels was arrested and charged for driving under the influence on April 21, 2013. He was released after about five hours. He eventually pleaded no contest to a reduced charge of reckless driving and was sentenced to 80 hours of community service plus probation.

In 2014, Michaels released his autobiography titled You Can't Make This Up: Memories and the Perfect Marriage of Sports and Television, which reached The New York Times Best Seller List for nonfiction.

Michaels has also claimed throughout the years that he has never knowingly eaten a vegetable in his lifetime.

Dick Enberg's death on December 21, 2017, left Michaels as the only living television play-by-play announcer from any of the first 34 Super Bowls.

In popular culture
It was Michaels who explained to Peter Jennings that Jennings had been the victim of a prank call in the final hour of O. J. Simpson's Bronco chase, after the Bronco had pulled into Simpson's driveway and parked. The prankster, claiming to be watching Simpson inside the van, described what he said to be the scene in perfect Stepin Fetchit dialect, then signed off with "... and Baba Booey to y'all." Michaels, unlike Jennings, understood the prankster's use of the term as an association of being a Howard Stern fan. Michaels is a Howard Stern fan, too, and has discussed that prank call as a guest on Stern's show.

Michaels had an acting role in a 1970 episode of Hawaii Five-O, and has appeared as himself in the films Jerry Maguire and BASEketball, as well as on several TV shows including Coach and Spin City. His call of the U.S. hockey team's victory in the 1980 Olympics can be heard in the 2004 film Miracle. Michaels re-recorded all his original play-by-play coverage for the film, except for the memorable line.

Brian d'Arcy James portrayed Michaels in the 2002 television movie Monday Night Mayhem. Michaels has also been lampooned on several occasions by noted impressionists, Frank Caliendo and Billy West as well as in the Family Guy episode "Mother Tucker".

Michaels was also the featured voice in HardBall III, a popular computer baseball game for PC. He was also featured, along with John Madden, in the Madden NFL series from Madden NFL 2003 to Madden NFL 09.

Michaels also appeared in two episodes of Arliss, portraying the older cousin of sports agent Arliss Michaels.

Notable broadcasts
Michaels was the play-by-play announcer for all notable events unless otherwise noted.

 1972 Winter Olympics men's ice hockey
 1972 National League Championship Series
 1972 World Series
 1977 NAPA National 500
 1978 Atlanta 500
 1979 Gabriel 400
 1979 World Series (Games 3–5)
 1980 Atlanta 500
 1980 Winter Olympics men's ice hockey ("Miracle on Ice")
 1981 World Series (Games 3–5)
 1982 Coca-Cola 500
 1982 CRC Chemicals Rebel 500
 1983 World Series
 1984 Winter Olympics men's ice hockey
 Super Bowl XIX (1985, co-host with Jim Lampley)
 1984 Summer Olympics athletics and road bicycle racing
 1985 World Series
 112th Kentucky Derby (1986, host)
 111th Preakness Stakes (1986, host)
 123rd Belmont Stakes (1986, host)
 1986 American League Championship Series
 113th Kentucky Derby (1987, host)
 112th Preakness Stakes (1987, host)
 124th Belmont Stakes (1987, host)
 1987 World Series
 Super Bowl XXII (1988)
 1988 Winter Olympics men's ice hockey
 114th Kentucky Derby (1988, host)
 113th Preakness Stakes (1988, host)
 125th Belmont Stakes (1988, host)
 1988 NLCS
 1989 Sugar Bowl
 115th Kentucky Derby (1989, host)
 114th Preakness Stakes (1989, host)
 126th Belmont Stakes (1989, host)
 1989 World Series
 1990 Sugar Bowl
 116th Kentucky Derby (1990, host)
 115th Preakness Stakes (1990, host)
 127th Belmont Stakes (1990, host)
 1991 Sugar Bowl
 Super Bowl XXV (1991)
 117th Kentucky Derby (1991, host)
 116th Preakness Stakes (1991, host)
 128th Belmont Stakes (1991, host)
 1992 Sugar Bowl
 118th Kentucky Derby (1992, host)
 117th Preakness Stakes (1992, host)
 129th Belmont Stakes (1992, host)
 119th Kentucky Derby (1993, host)
 118th Preakness Stakes (1993, host)
 1993 Stanley Cup Finals (host)
 130th Belmont Stakes (1993, host)
 120th Kentucky Derby (1994, host)
 119th Preakness Stakes (1994, host)
 131st Belmont Stakes (1994, host)
 Super Bowl XXIX (1995)
 121st Kentucky Derby (1995, host)
 120th Preakness Stakes (1995, host)
 132nd Belmont Stakes (1995, host)
 1995 World Series (Games 1, 4–5)
 122nd Kentucky Derby (1996, host)
 121st Preakness Stakes (1996, host)
 133rd Belmont Stakes (1996, host)
 123rd Kentucky Derby (1997, host)
 122nd Preakness Stakes (1997, host)
 134th Belmont Stakes (1997, host)
 124th Kentucky Derby (1998, host)
 123rd Preakness Stakes (1998, host)
 135th Belmont Stakes (1998, host)
 125th Kentucky Derby (1999, host)
 124th Preakness Stakes (1999, Host)
 1999 Indianapolis 500 (host)
 136th Belmont Stakes (1999, host)
 Super Bowl XXXIV (2000)
 126th Kentucky Derby (2000, host)
 125th Preakness Stakes (2000, host)
 2000 Indianapolis 500 (host)
 2000 Stanley Cup Finals (host)
 137th Belmont Stakes (2000, host)
 2001 Indianapolis 500 (host)
 2001 Stanley Cup Finals (host)
 2002 Stanley Cup Finals (host)
 Super Bowl XXXVII (2003)
 NBA on Christmas Day 2004: Los Angeles Lakers vs Miami Heat
 2004 NBA Finals
 NBA on Christmas Day 2005: Los Angeles Lakers vs Miami Heat
 2005 NBA Finals
 Super Bowl XL (2006; last Super Bowl and NFL telecast for ABC)
 Super Bowl XLIII (2009; last telecast paired with color commentator John Madden)
 2010 Winter Olympics (daytime host and co-host of closing ceremony)
 The "Butt Fumble" November 22, 2012
 Super Bowl XLVI (2012)
 2012 Summer Olympics (daytime host and co-host of closing ceremony)
 2014 Winter Olympics (weekday host for NBCSN, weekend daytime host for NBC and co-host for closing ceremony)
 Super Bowl XLIX (2015)
 2016 Summer Olympics (daytime co-host)
 Super Bowl LII (2018)
 Super Bowl LVI (2022)

Career timeline
 1968–1970: Hawaii Islanders Play-by-play
 1971–1973: Cincinnati Reds Radio Play-by-play
 1971–1974: NFL on NBC Play-by-play
 1972 and 1980–1988: Winter Olympics Hockey Play-by-play (NBC 1972, ABC 1980–1988)
 1973–1975: UCLA Basketball TV Play-by-play
 1974–1976: San Francisco Giants TV & Radio Play-by-play
 1975: NFL on CBS Play-by-play
 1976–1989, 1994–1995: Major League Baseball on ABC Play-by-play (Lead Play-by-play from 1983 to 1989 and 1994 to 1995)
 1977–1985: College Football on ABC Play-by-play
 1986–2005: ABC Monday Night Football Play-by-play
 1986–2000: Kentucky Derby Host (ABC)
 1986–2000: Preakness Stakes Host (ABC)
 1986–2000: Belmont Stakes Host (ABC)
 1987–1989: College Basketball on ABC Play-by-play
 1989–1992: Sugar Bowl Play-by-play (ABC)
 2000–2002: NHL on ABC Stanley Cup Finals host
 2003–2005: NBA on ABC Play-by-play
 2006–2021: NBC Sunday Night Football Play-by-play
 2015: PBC on NBC Host
 2016: Thursday Night Football on NBC/NFL Network Play-by-play
 2022–present: Thursday Night Football on Amazon Prime Video Play-by-play
 2022–present: NBC Sports Emeritus role

Broadcast partners

 Hubie Brown
 Frank Broyles
 Nelson Burton, Jr.
 Norm Cash
 Cris Collinsworth
 Howard Cosell
 Heather Cox
 Dan Dierdorf
 Ken Dryden
 Don Drysdale
 Boomer Esiason
 Dan Fouts
 Bob Gibson
 Frank Gifford
 Lisa Guerrero
 Lee Grosscup
 Kaylee Hartung
 Kirk Herbstreit
 Suzy Kolber
 Andrea Kremer
 Tommy Lasorda
 John Madden
 Tim McCarver
 Dennis Miller
 Joe Nuxhall
 Jim Palmer
 Ara Parseghian
 Doc Rivers
 Lon Simmons
 Melissa Stark
 Michele Tafoya
 Kathryn Tappen
 Mike Tirico
 Bob Uecker
 Lesley Visser
 Wayne Walker
 Earl Weaver
 Bill White

References

1944 births
Living people
American male film actors
American male television actors
American male voice actors
Alexander Hamilton High School (Los Angeles) alumni
American horse racing announcers
American radio sports announcers
American sports journalists
American television sports announcers
Arizona State University alumni
Walter Cronkite School of Journalism and Mass Communication alumni
Boxing commentators
Bowling broadcasters
California Republicans
Cincinnati Reds announcers
College basketball announcers in the United States
College football announcers
Cycling announcers
Figure skating commentators
Ford C. Frick Award recipients
Golf writers and broadcasters
Hawaii Rainbow Warriors basketball
Hawaii Rainbow Warriors football
Jewish American sportspeople
Los Angeles Lakers announcers
Major League Baseball broadcasters
Minor League Baseball broadcasters
Motorsport announcers
National Basketball Association broadcasters
National Football League announcers
National Hockey League broadcasters
Olympic Games broadcasters
Pete Rozelle Radio-Television Award recipients
San Francisco Giants announcers
Sports Emmy Award winners
Sportspeople from Brooklyn
Sportspeople from Los Angeles
Track and field broadcasters
UCLA Bruins basketball
United States Football League announcers
21st-century American Jews